The Flöha Valley Railway may refer to one of two railways in the Flöha Valley:

 Reitzenhain–Flöha railway
 Pockau-Lengefeld–Neuhausen railway